This is a season-by-season list of records compiled by New Hampshire in men's ice hockey.

The University of New Hampshire has reached two NCAA Championship games in its history, the most recent coming in 2003.

Season-by-season results

Note: GP = Games played, W = Wins, L = Losses, T = Ties

* Winning percentage is used when conference schedules are unbalanced.† UNH played a partial ECAC schedule.^ After the season Maine was retroactively forced to forfeit 13 games. The record here represents official results.

Footnotes

References

 
Lists of college men's ice hockey seasons in the United States
New Hampshire Wildcats ice hockey seasons